Plastic, stylized all caps, is the second studio album by Japanese singer Aira Mitsuki, released on July 22, 2009 by D-topia Entertainment and Victor Entertainment. The album contains features from artists Ayuse Kozue, Kuchiroro, Shigeo from Japanese bands SBK and The Samos, and the album producer Ōnishi Terukado.

Plastic was preceded by three singles: "Robot Honey", "Sayonara Technopolis", and "Barbie Barbie". "Robot Honey" was released on October 26, 2008, followed by "Sayonara Technopolis" on January 21, 2009 and "Barbie Barbie" on May 20, 2009. "Plastic Doll" became the album's title track and was given a music video. The concert "Aira Mitsuki Special Live '090319' in Liquidroom" supported the singles.

Upon its release, Plastic debuted at the thirty-third spot of the Oricon Weekly Albums Chart and later selling 4,195 copies, becoming her current best-selling album according to Oricon.

Editions 
The album was released as a regular album and two special editions, one of which contains a live DVD and the other a remix CD.

Track listing 
Adapted from the album's Oricon page and Apple Music credits.

CD/digital download version

Notes
 "Natsu Ame" contains the chorus taken from the song "Fantasy Candy" from her debut album Copy (2008).
 "Knee-high Girl" is a B-side track from the "Robot Honey" single.
 "Change My Will" is a B-side track from the "Barbie Barbie" single.
 "High Speed Dance Sneaker" and "Distant Stars" are B-side tracks from the "Sayonara Technopolis" single.

Charts

Credits 
Credits adapted from RateYourMusic.

 Aira Mitsuki - vocals, lyrics
 Terukado Ōnishi - executive producer, featured vocals, producer
 Takafumi Nagaiwa - recording engineer, mastering engineer
 Maki Saito - art direction, graphic design
 Kazunori Wataya - photography
 Ayuse Kozue - featured vocals
 Kuchiroro - featured vocals, lyrics, music, producer
 Shigeo (SBK/The Samos) - featured vocals, producer, lyrics, music

 Alex Funk It - music
 NExx WORKS - music
 Kampkin Malkee - music
 TO-WEST - arrangements, mixing, lyrics
 Electric Invaders - arrangements, mixing
 Discotica2oooo6969 - arrangements, mixing
 Tokyo Ikejiri Plastic Babe - arrangements, mixing
 Hitoshi Ohishi - mixing

References

2009 albums
Aira Mitsuki albums
Victor Entertainment albums
Electronic albums by Japanese artists